Freddy José Salazar Ramirez (born 11 April 1949) is a Venezuelan fencer. He competed in the individual and team foil events at the 1968 Summer Olympics.

References

External links
 

1949 births
Living people
Venezuelan male foil fencers
Olympic fencers of Venezuela
Fencers at the 1968 Summer Olympics
Sportspeople from Caracas